Arkadiusz Mysona (born 11 May 1981) is a Polish former professional footballer who played as a midfielder.

Career
Mysona was born in Szczecin. In April 2008, while at ŁKS Łódź, he wore a shirt which said "Śmierć żydzewskiej kurwie" ("Death to Widzew-Jewish Whore", which is word play used by the LKS Łódź  supporters, who call fans of their local rivals "Jews") after a match in the Polish Ekstraklasa. Mysona said afterwards that the shirt was given to him by a fan and he had not checked it. In February 2011, he joined LKS Nieciecza on one and a half year contract.

References

External links
 

1981 births
Living people
Sportspeople from Szczecin
Association football midfielders
Polish footballers
Pogoń Szczecin players
ŁKS Łódź players
Lechia Gdańsk players
Polonia Bytom players
Bruk-Bet Termalica Nieciecza players
Torgelower FC Greif players
Wisła Płock players
Chojniczanka Chojnice players
Arkonia Szczecin players
Polish expatriate footballers
Polish expatriate sportspeople in Germany